Alain Estève (born 15 September 1946) is a retired French international rugby union player. He played as a lock for AS Béziers. Esteve was placed No2 on The Sunday Times list of "most frightening French rugby players".

Honours 
 Selected to represent France, 1971–1974
 French rugby champion, 1971, 1972, 1974, 1975, 1977, 1978, 1980, 1981 with AS Béziers
 Challenge Yves du Manoir 1972, 1975 and 1977 with AS Béziers
 French championship finalist 1976 with AS Béziers

External links
Statistiques scrum.com
 The top 10 frightening Frenchmen

People from Castelnaudary
1946 births
French rugby union players
Living people
France international rugby union players
Rugby union flankers
Rugby union locks
Sportspeople from Aude